Lepidochrysops lunulifer is a butterfly in the family Lycaenidae. It is found in Ethiopia.

References

Butterflies described in 1932
Lepidochrysops
Endemic fauna of Ethiopia
Butterflies of Africa